Elizabeth, comtesse de Gramont (née Hamilton; 1641–1708), was an Irish-born courtier, first after the Restoration at the court of Charles II of England in Whitehall and later, after her marriage to Philibert de Gramont, at the court of Louis XIV where she was a lady-in-waiting to the French queen, Maria Theresa of Spain.

Known as "la belle Hamilton", she was one of the Windsor Beauties painted by Peter Lely. She appears prominently in the Mémoires du comte de Grammont, written by her brother Anthony.

Birth and origins 

Elizabeth was born in 1641, in Ireland, probably at Nenagh, County Tipperary. She was the third child of George Hamilton and his wife Mary Butler. Her father was Scottish, the fourth son of James Hamilton, 1st Earl of Abercorn, and would in 1660 be created baronet of Donalong and Nenagh.

Her mother, Mary, was the third daughter of Thomas Butler, Viscount Thurles, and a sister of the future 1st Duke of Ormond. Her mother's family, the Butler dynasty, was Old English and descended from Theobald Walter, who had been appointed Chief Butler of Ireland by King Henry II in 1177.

Both her parents were Catholic. They had married in 1629. Elizabeth was one of nine siblings, who are listed in her father's article.

In 1640 Ormond granted Elizabeth's father the manor, castle, town, and lands of Nenagh for 31 years in lieu of the still unpaid dowry. Nenagh was therefore where the family settled down and where Elizabeth was born.

Irish wars 
The Irish Rebellion of 1641 broke out in the year of her birth. The rebellion was followed by the Irish Confederate Wars (1642–1648) and the Cromwellian conquest of Ireland (1649-1653). Elizabeth, her siblings and her mother seem to have lived in the family's home in Nenagh,in the territory held by the Confederates, while her father served Ormond in the Irish army which fought against the Confederates until the Cessation signed in 1643.

However, in September 1646 Rinuccini, the papal nuncio, overthrew the Confederate Supreme Council in a coup d'état with help of Owen Roe O'Neill's Confederate Ulster Army. O'Neill led his army south to Kilkenny, the Confederate capital, where he arrived the 16th. Rinuccini then took power appointing a new Supreme Council the 26th. In the meantime, on the 17th, Ulster troops sacked Roscrea. The ulstermen had a reputation for living off the inhabitants, even friendly ones. Carte (1736) reports that "Sir G. Hamilton's lady, sister to the marquis of Ormond" was spared at Roscrea. However, it is more likely that Elizabeth, her mother, and siblings were safely at Nenagh ( west of Roscrea) and that the Lady Hamilton at Roscrea was his grandaunt, the wife of George Hamilton of Greenlaw and Roscrea, not her mother.

In 1649, during the Cromwellian conquest of Ireland, her father was colonel of an infantry regiment and governor of Nenagh. He defended Nenagh Castle in November 1650 when it was attacked and captured by the Parliamentarian army under Henry Ireton on the way back from their unsuccessful siege of Limerick to their winter quarters at Kilkenny.

French exile 
Early in 1651, when she was about ten, her father followed Ormond into French exile. The family first went to Caen where they were accommodated for some time by Elizabeth Preston, the Marchioness of Ormond. Her father and her elder brothers, James and George, were soon employed by Charles II in various functions. She then left for Paris with her mother, who would find shelter in the convent of the Feuillantines, together with her sister Eleanor Butler, Lady Muskerry, while she was sent to boarding school at the abbey of Cistercian nuns of Port-Royal-des-Champs, near Versailles. This school had an excellent reputation and was ahead of its time by teaching in French rather than in Latin. She attended this school for seven or eight years, together with her cousin Helen Muskerry. The abbey also was a stronghold of Jansenism, a Catholic religious movement that insisted on earnestness and asceticism but which was later declared heretic for its position on grace and original sin.

Having left school, she was associated with the court in exile of Henrietta Maria, the dowager queen, Charles I's widow, who had fled to France in 1644 and had in 1657 moved to the Château de Colombes, near Paris. In March 1660 she met Sir John Reresby at the celebration of the Restoration organised by Henrietta Maria at the Palais-Royal in Paris.

Whitehall 
She became a member of the English court at Whitehall in 1661. She was admired as a great beauty and called "la belle Hamilton". She also became known for her judgement, charm and sensibility. She was seen as witty and careful with her words as she, reportedly, said no more than she thought. She also loved practical jokes and mischief. So she made fun of Margaret Bourke, a rich heiress, whom her cousin Lord Muskerry had married, by making her believe that she had been invited to a masquerade by the Queen and had to disguise herself as a Babylonian woman. This episode is told in the Mémoires du comte de Grammont.

She was much courted at Whitehall. First of all by the Duke of Richmond whom she rejected when she found out that he would not marry her without a dowry. She also resisted the advances of Henry Jermyn, 1st Baron Dover, though reputed irresistible. She was not tempted by the thirty thousand per year of the heir of Norfolk. She rejected Charles Berkeley, 1st Earl of Falmouth. When courted by the Duke of York, the future King James II, she doubted the sincerity of his intentions as he had just married Anne Hyde in 1660.

Finally, in January 1663, appeared on the scene Philibert, chevalier de Gramont, a French exile. He was already in his forties and a younger half-brother of Antoine III, duc de Gramont. He had got into trouble at the French court by courting Mademoiselle Anne-Lucie de la Mothe-Houdancourt, on whom Louis XIV had set his eyes.

De Gramont quickly entered the English court's inner circle. Not much adaptation was needed as French was the predominant language at the Restoration court. Elizabeth admired his wit and gallantry and fell in love with him.

Marriage and children 
Philibert married her in London late in 1663 or early in 1664. In March 1664, having heard of his marriage, Louis XIV wrote him a letter giving him permission to return. The couple had a son on 28 August old style, but he died as an infant.

A famous anecdote is told about her marriage, which reverts the order of events by placing the marriage, which was according to this tale forced on de Gramont by her brothers, after the permission to return. It goes as follows:

When in 1664 he was allowed to return to France, he left in haste, giving the impression that he would not honour his commitments. Her brothers George and Anthony, therefore, pursued and intercepted him on his way to Dover and pressured him to return and marry her. They asked him whether he had not forgotten something in London. He replied "Pardonnez-moi, messieurs, j'ai oublié d'épouser votre sœur." (Forgive me, Sirs, I have forgotten to marry your sister). He turned around, went back to London, and dutifully married her.

The story is partly proven wrong since he married her before Louis allowed him to come back, but it could well be true that a bit of pressure from her brothers was needed. It has been said that this incident suggested to Molière his comedy Le mariage forcé, first presented on 29 January 1664, but this idea clashes with the known dates.

 
Elizabeth and Philibert had two daughters, who were maids-of-honour to Maria Anna Victoria of Bavaria, whom the Grand Dauphin married in 1680.
Claude Charlotte (c. 1665 – 1739), married Henry Stafford-Howard, 1st Earl of Stafford.

The marriage of the elder daughter was childless and the younger was a nun. Philibert's cadet branch of the house of Gramont, therefore, ended here.

At the French court 
She went with her husband to France and was appointed in 1667 dame du palais or lady-in-waiting to the French Queen, Maria Theresa of Spain. At that time the French court was seated at the Louvre in Paris, not yet at Versailles. At the court she was recognised as a woman of considerable wit and beauty. She also knew how to hold her own at the court of Louis XIV, being said to have "beak and claws". Her husband nevertheless pursued his gallant exploits to the close of a long life, being, said Ninon de l'Enclos, the only old man who could affect the follies of youth without being ridiculous.

In 1679, at the death of his elder brother Henri, who had appointed him his heir, her husband became comte de Toulongeon. He did not want to change his name to Toulongeon, but changed it from chevalier de Gramont to comte de Gramont. She was henceforth known as the comtesse de Gramont.

In 1679 she was pointed out as a client of La Voisin, and was thereby incriminated in the affaire des poisons. However, no action was taken against her. In May 1682 the French court moved its seat from the Louvre to the Palace of Versailles. In 1683 she lost her appointment as lady-in-waiting due to the queen's death. In 1684 Fénelon became a spiritual guide to her. In May 1690 the King assigned her an apartment in the Palace of Versailles that had been freed by the death of Charles de Sainte-Maure, duc de Montausier, the Dauphin's tutor.

On 6 April 1694 N.S. her daughter Claude Charlotte, aged 29, married Henry Stafford-Howard, 1st Earl of Stafford, aged 46, who had fled to France with James II. The marriage was held at Saint-Germain-en-Laye. She thus became Lady Stafford. He had been made Earl Stafford by James II on 5 October 1688 and had, at the same time, changed his name from Howard to Stafford-Howard. As the earldom was created before James II's flight, it was a valid English peerage and not a Jacobite one. The marriage would remain childless and was not happy.

In 1696, her husband fell gravely ill, and after he recovered, he followed her example and turned to devotion. In 1699, she fell into disgrace because of a visit she had paid to the abbey of Port-Royal-des-Champs. The king disliked the Jansenists. She had to beg his pardon.

In May 1703, when she was 61, Louis XIV lent her a house near the end of the Gardens of Versailles, called Les Moulineaux, which she renamed Pontalie. This name is explained in the story "Le Bélier", written by her brother Anthony, who derives it from "pont d'Alie" (Alie's bridge), Alie being the daughter of a druid who marries a Prince of Noisy (after nearby Noisy-le-Roi) in the story.

Death and timeline 
Her husband died on 31 January 1707 in Paris. She died about a year later on 3 June 1708 in Paris.

Notes and references

Notes

Citations

Sources 

 
 
 
 
 
 
 
  – 1643 to 1660
 
 
  – S to T (for Stafford)
  – 1649 to 1664
  – Ab-Adam to Basing
 
 
 
 
 
  – 1684 to 1686
  – 1689 to 1691
  – 1706 to 1707
  – 1707 to 1709
  – England
  – Scotland and Ireland
 
  – (for timeline)
  – Does not seem to be available online
  – Princeps
 
 
 
 
 – Commentary by Cyril Hughes Hartmann on Hamilton's Memoirs in Quennell's translation
 
  – GAR to GUE (for Gramont)
 
 
 

  
 
  – Abercorn to Balmerino
 
 
  
 
  – 1703
  – 1706 to 1707
  – 1708 
 
  
  – 1643 to 1660 and index

External links 

Elizabeth Hamilton as Saint Catherine by Peter Lely, one of his series of Windsor Beauties
The lost Settlement of Dunnalong

1640 births
1708 deaths
17th-century Irish people
17th-century Irish women
Affair of the Poisons
Court of Charles II of England
Daughters of baronets
English countesses
English ladies-in-waiting
French ladies-in-waiting
People from County Tyrone